Ruth Baird Leavitt Owen Rohde, also known as Ruth Bryan Owen, (née Bryan; October 2, 1885 – July 26, 1954) was an American politician and diplomat who represented  in the United States House of Representatives from 1929 to 1933 and served as United States Envoy to Denmark from 1933 to 1936. She was the first woman elected to Congress from Florida and just the second woman ever elected to the House from the American South, after Alice Mary Robertson of Oklahoma. Owen became the first woman to earn a seat on the House Committee on Foreign Affairs. A member of the Democratic Party, she was the first woman chief of mission at the minister rank in U.S. diplomatic history under President Franklin D. Roosevelt.

Biography

Early years
Ruth Bryan was born on October 2, 1885, in Jacksonville, Illinois to William Jennings Bryan and his wife Mary E. Baird. Ruth's father was congressman and a three-time presidential candidate. Growing up Ruth had to move several times depending on her father's work in politics. Ruth attended public schools in Washington, D.C and the Monticello Female Academy in Godfrey, Illinois. In 1901 she began to take classes at the University of Nebraska.

In 1903 Bryan dropped out of the University of Nebraska to marry William H. Leavitt, a well-known Newport, Rhode Island portrait painter. The couple met when he was painting Bryan's father's portrait. The couple had two children before divorcing in 1909.

Bryan married Reginald Owen, a British Army officer, in 1910, and had two more children with him. Her second husband died in 1928. She spent three years in Oracabessa, Jamaica, where she oversaw the design and construction of her home, Golden Clouds. It is now operated as a luxury villa. Owen kept her home in Jamaica for more than three decades and spent many winters there, particularly in later years when she lived in Denmark and New York City.  She detailed her time in Jamaica and experiences at Golden Clouds in her book, Caribbean Caravel.

During World War I, Bryan served as a war nurse in the Voluntary Aid Detachment in the Egypt–Palestine campaign, 1915–1918. She also served as a secretary for the American Women's War Relief Fund.

Filmmaking career
Ruth Bryan Owen was a female pioneer in the film industry. She was a director, producer, and screenwriter for a feature film in 1922, called Once Upon a Time/Scheherazade, which is now considered to be lost. In the spring of 1921, she started production of Once Upon a Time. The film featured the Community Players of Coconut Grove, Florida, and was not related to a major studio at the time.

The story line was said to revolve around a shah who is dethroned by his jealous subordinate, who in turn uses his new power to torture young women who do not amuse him. Towards the end, the sadistic ruler runs into the most beautiful one of all, and the exiled shah returns just in time to save the young woman from his nemesis. According to the Moving Picture World, the costuming was ornate and elaborately done, the staging was complicated, and the mise-en-scène evoked an "atmosphere of experience in the Far East". Owen had done extensive traveling, and visited countries such as India, Burma, Sri Lanka, China and Japan. Inspired by these places, she used them as the backdrop for her film.

Little would be known about the film except that Owen discussed it in correspondence with her friend, Carrie Dunlap. Dunlap was from Illinois and served as campaign treasurer for Ruth's father William Jennings Bryan. In her letters to Dunlap, Owen expresses great joy in her film, quoting, "I can scarcely believe the film is mine when I see it 'projected' on the wall above our fireplace."

She thought of herself as a true pioneer in the industry. Her correspondence with Dunlap also revealed her intent to become one of the first female filmmakers in the U.S. Owen funded the film solely from her earnings in the public speaker circuit. In her letters, Owen discussed the support she gained from the General Federation of Women's Clubs, and their contribution to help secure a distribution deal with the Society for Visual Education.

Political career

Owen first ran for office in 1926 for the Democratic nomination for Florida's 4th congressional district. It was a year after the death of her father. It then included nearly the entire east coast of the state from Jacksonville to the Florida Keys: with Miami, Orlando and St. Augustine. She lost the primary by fewer than 800 votes to incumbent William J. Sears.

From 1925 to 1928, she was an administrator at the University of Miami.

In 1928, after the death of her husband, Owen ran again. Having played a significant role when a hurricane hit Miami in 1927 and put efforts into promotions in newspapers, she won over Sears by more than 14,000 votes and was elected to Congress in November 1928 and began her term of office on March 4, 1929, while a widow and mother of four. Her election was contested on the grounds that she had lost her citizenship by marrying an alien. By the Cable Act in 1922, she could petition for her citizenship, which she did in 1925, less than the seven years required by the Constitution. She argued her case before the House Committee on Elections, saying that no American man had ever lost his citizenship by marriage. She said that she lost her citizenship because she was a woman, not because of her marital status. The U.S. House of Representatives voted in her favor.

Owen ran for re-election in 1930, defeating Daytona Beach attorney Dewitt T. Deen by a wide margin in the June Democratic primary election. As the Republican Party did not nominate a candidate to run in the 4th Congressional District, the pro-Prohibition Owen was heralded in the press as presumably having won re-election by virtue of her Democratic nomination.

Owen's two-year term won in 1930 would prove to be her last, however, as in the 1932 Democratic primary, she was defeated by Democratic candidate J. Mark Wilcox, who advocated the repeal of Prohibition. Her Congressional career thus came to an end in March 1933.

First U.S. female ambassador
From 1933 to 1936, Bryan Owen served as United States Ambassador to Denmark, appointed by President Franklin D. Roosevelt. She would become the first women to represent the United States in a foreign country as part of a diplomatic delegation. While serving in her position to Denmark one of her primary goals was to restore Danish-American relations which had been damaged because of the Smoot–Hawley Tariff Act.

She served successfully until 1936, when she married Børge Rohde, a Danish Captain of the King's Guard, on July 11. The marriage gave her dual citizenship as a Dane—in addition to that of the United States—so she resigned her ambassadorial post in September. The wedding took place at the estate of President Franklin Delano Roosevelt and Eleanor Roosevelt in Hyde Park, New York.  Fannie Hurst, noted novelist and close friend of the bride, was matron of honor. Mrs. Owen announced that she would retain her own name in her diplomatic and literary careers.

She served as a delegate to the San Francisco Conference, which established the United Nations after World War II. In 1948, President Truman named her an alternate delegate to the U.N. General Assembly.

Later years, death and legacy

In 1939, Ruth Bryan Owen and her husband purchased "The Cedars", located at Alderson, West Virginia, and began making repairs.  They sold the property in 1945.   It was listed on the National Register of Historic Places in 1978.

While in Denmark to accept the Danish Medal of Merit, she would die of a heart attack  in Copenhagen on July 26, 1954. She would be cremated with her ashes being interred at Ordrup Cemetery, Copenhagen.

In 1992, Owen was inducted into the Florida Women's Hall of Fame.

Footnotes

Works

 Elements of Public Speaking New York, H. Liveright, 1931.
 Leaves from a Greenland Diary New York: Dodd, Mead & Co., 1935.
 Denmark Caravan New York: Dodd, Mead & Co., 1936.
 Picture Tales from Scandinavia Philadelphia: J.B. Lippincott Co., 1939.
 The Castle in the Silver Wood and Other Scandinavian Fairy Tales New York: Dodd, Mead & Co., 1939.
 Look Forward, Warrior New York: Dodd, Mead & Co., 1942.
 Caribbean Caravel New York: Dodd, Mead & Co., 1949.

Filmography

Once Upon A Time.

See also
 Women in the United States House of Representatives

Further reading

 Gail Clement, Reclaiming the Everglades: Ruth Bryan Owen (Rohde). Florida International University.
 Philip Weidling and August Burghard, Checkered Sunshine. Ft. Lauderdale, FL: Wake-Brook House, 1974.

External links

Ruth Owen bibliography at OWEN, Ruth Bryan | US House of Representatives: History, Art & Archives
Ruth Bryan Owen  at the Women Film Pioneers Project
Political Graveyard:  The Bryan Family  

1885 births
1954 deaths
20th-century American diplomats
20th-century American politicians
20th-century American women politicians
Ambassadors of the United States to Denmark
American temperance activists
American women ambassadors
American women in World War I
American women nurses
Bryan family
Democratic Party members of the United States House of Representatives from Florida
Female members of the United States House of Representatives
University of Miami faculty
Women film pioneers
Women in Florida politics